That's Cricket is a 1931 Australian featurette from director Ken G. Hall about the game of cricket and its importance to the British Empire. It features appearances from some of Australia's top cricketers of the day and footage of the Australian cricket team in England in 1930.

Cast
Lionel Lunn
Don Bradman
Clarrie Grimmett
Clem Hill
Alan Kippax
Stan McCabe
William Oldfield
Bill Ponsford
Bill Woodfull

References

External links
That's Cricket in the Internet Movie Database
That's Cricket at National Film and Sound Archive
That's Cricket at Australian Screen Online

1931 films
Films directed by Ken G. Hall
Australian black-and-white films
Featurettes
Cricket films
1930s Australian films
1930s English-language films
Cinesound Productions films